The discography of Swedish eurodance singer Pandora consists of ten studio albums, one Remix albums, four compilations and thirty-seven singles.

Albums

Studio albums

Remix albums

Compilation albums

Singles

References

Pop music discographies
Discographies of Swedish artists